Attulus caricis is a species of spider in the family Salticidae (jumping spiders). It has a Palearctic distribution, including Britain. Until 2017, it was placed in the genus Sitticus.

Description
Like other species in the genus, the basic body colour is dull brown or dark grey. Markings vary, with some specimens having orange and white hairs.

Distribution 
Attulus caricis is found in Europe, Turkey, the Caucasus, Russia, Kazakhstan, and Mongolia.

References

Sitticini
Palearctic spiders
Spiders described in 1861